Deutsche Internationale Schule Zagreb (DISZ) is a German international school in Zagreb, Croatia. It serves kindergarten, grundschule, and gymasium leading up to Abitur.

It is a part of the EuroCampus Zagreb, with the École française de Zagreb. The EuroCampus opened on September 1, 2005.

References

External links

  Deutsche Internationale Schule in Zagreb

International schools in Croatia
Schools in Zagreb
Zagreb
Croatia–Germany relations
Educational institutions established in 2005
2005 establishments in Croatia